Twadell Brook flows into Beaver Kill by East Branch, New York.

Rivers of New York (state)
Rivers of Delaware County, New York
Tributaries of the East Branch Delaware River